Regional elections were held in the Czech Republic to elect the Regional Councils of 13 regions (all except Prague) on 12 November 2000. Voter turnout was only 33.6%. The elections were won by the Civic Democratic Party, with Four-Coalition coming second and the ruling Czech Social Democratic Party in fourth.

Opinion polls

Results

References

2000
2000 elections in the Czech Republic
November 2000 events in Europe